The 1941 California Golden Bears football team was an American football team that represented the University of California, Berkeley as a member of the Pacific Coast Conference during the 1941 college football season.	In their seventh season under head coach Stub Allison, the Golden Bears compiled a 4–5 record (3–4 against PCC opponents), finished seventh in the PCC, and outscored opponents by a total of 107 to 71.

Tackle Bob Reinhard was selected by both the Associated Press and United Press as a first-team player on the 1941 All-Pacific Coast football team.

Schedule

References

California
California Golden Bears football seasons
California Golden Bears football